is a Japanese manga series written and illustrated by Aoi Ikebe. It was adapted into a live action film of the same name, which was released on January 31, 2015.

Characters
Ichie

Volumes
1 (March 11, 2011)
2 (October 13, 2011)
3 (August 10, 2012)
4 (July 12, 2013)
5 (March 13, 2014)
6 (January 23, 2015)

See also
Princess Maison, another manga series by the same author

References

External links
Tsukuroi Tatsu Hito at Kodansha 

Kodansha manga
Manga adapted into films
2015 comics endings
2010s Japanese films